Nana Saheb Peshwa II (19 May 1824 – 24 September 1859), born as Dhondu Pant, was an Indian Peshwa of the Maratha empire, aristocrat and fighter, who led the rebellion in Cawnpore (Kanpur) during the Great Revolt of 1857. As the adopted son of the exiled Maratha Peshwa Baji Rao II, Nana Saheb believed that he was entitled to a pension from the East India Company, but the underlying contractual issues are rather murky. The Company's refusal to continue the pension after his father's death, as well as what he perceived as high-handed policies, led him to join the rebellion. He forced the British garrison in Kanpur to surrender, then murdered the survivors, gaining control of Kanpur for a few days. He later disappeared, after his forces were defeated by a British force that recaptured Kanpur. He later fled  to Naimisha Forest in Nepal where he was said to have died in 1859.

Early life

Nana was born on 19 May 1824 as Nana Govind Dhondu Pant, to Narayan Bhat and Ganga Bai. After the Maratha defeat in the Third Maratha War, the East India Company had exiled Peshwa Baji Rao II to Bithur (near Kanpur), where he maintained a large establishment paid for in part out of a British pension. Nana's father, a well-educated Deccani Brahmin, had travelled with his family from the Western Ghats to become a court official of the former Peshwa at Bithoor. Lacking sons, Baji Rao adopted Nana Saheb and his younger brother in 1827. The mother of both children was a sister of one of the Peshwa's wives. Nana Saheb's childhood associates included Tatya Tope, Azimullah Khan and Manikarnika Tambe. Tatya Tope was the son of Pandurang Rao Tope, an important noble at the court of the Peshwa Baji Rao II. After Baji Rao II was exiled to Bithoor, Pandurang Rao and his family also shifted there. Tatya Tope was the fencing master to Nana Saheb. Azimullah Khan joined the court of Nana Saheb as Secretary, after the death of Baji Rao II in 1851. He later became the dewan in Nana Saheb's court.

Inheritance

The Doctrine of lapse was an annexation policy devised by Lord Dalhousie, who was the British Governor-General of India between 1848 and 1856. According to the Doctrine, any princely state or territory under the direct influence (paramountcy) of the British East India Company (the dominant imperial power in the subcontinent), as a vassal state under the British Subsidiary System, would automatically be annexed if the ruler was either "manifestly incompetent or died without a direct heir". The latter supplanted the long-established legal right of an Indian sovereign without an heir to choose a successor. In addition, the British were to decide whether potential rulers were competent enough. The doctrine and its application were widely regarded by Indians as illegitimate. At that time, the Company had absolute, imperial administrative jurisdiction over many regions spread over the subcontinent.

Role in the 1857 uprising 

Nana Saheb won the confidence of Charles Hillersdon, the Collector of Kanpur. It was planned that Nana Saheb would assemble a force of 1,500 soldiers to support the British, in case the rebellion spread to Kanpur.

On 6 June 1857, at the time of the rebellion by forces of the East India Company at Kanpur, the British contingent had taken refuge at an entrenchment in the northern part of the town. Amid the prevailing chaos in Kanpur, Nana and his forces entered the British magazine situated in the northern part of the town. The soldiers of the 53rd Native Infantry, who were guarding the magazine, thought that Nana had come to guard the magazine on behalf of the Company. However, once he entered the magazine, Nana Saheb announced that he was a participant in the rebellion against the Company, and intended to be a vassal of Bahadur Shah II.

After taking possession of the Company treasury, Nana advanced up the Grand Trunk Road stating that he wanted to restore the Maratha confederacy under the Peshwa tradition, and decided to capture Kanpur. On his way, Nana met the rebel Company soldiers at Kalyanpur. The soldiers were on their way to Delhi, to meet Bahadur Shah II. Nana wanted them to go back to Kanpur and help him defeat the British. The soldiers were reluctant at first, but decided to join Nana when he promised to double their pay and reward them with gold, if they were to destroy the British entrenchment.

Attack on Wheeler's entrenchment

On 5 June 1857, Nana Saheb sent a letter to General Wheeler informing him to expect an attack next morning at 10 am. On 6 June, his forces (including the rebel soldiers) attacked the Company entrenchment at 10:30 am. The Company forces were not adequately prepared for the attack but managed to defend themselves as the attacking forces were reluctant to enter the entrenchment. The Indian forces had been led to believe that the entrenchment had gunpowder-filled trenches that would explode if they got closer. The Company side held out in their makeshift fort for three weeks with little water and food supplies, and lost many lives due to sunstroke and lack of water.

As the news of advances over the British garrison spread, more rebel sepoys joined Nana Saheb. By 10 June, he was believed to be leading around twelve thousand to fifteen thousand Indian soldiers. During the first week of the siege, Nana Saheb's forces encircled the attachment, created loopholes and established firing positions from the surrounding buildings. The defending Captain John Moore retaliated and launched night-time sorties. Nana Saheb then withdrew his headquarters to Savada House (or Savada Kothi), which was situated around two miles away. In response to Moore's sorties, Nana Saheb decided to attempt a direct assault on the British entrenchment, but the rebel soldiers displayed a lack of enthusiasm.

The sniper fire and the bombardment continued until 23 June 1857 One of the driving forces of the rebellion by sepoys, was a prophecy that predicted the downfall of East India Company rule exactly one hundred years after this battle. This prompted the rebel soldiers under Nana Saheb to launch a major attack on the entrenchment on 23 June 1857. However, they were unable to gain an entry into the entrenchment by the end of the day.

Satichaura Ghat massacre

On the morning of 27 June, Wheeler's column, consisting primarily of unarmed civilians and including more than 300 women and children, emerged from the entrenchment. Nana sent a number of carts, dolis and elephants to enable the women, the children and the sick to proceed to the river banks. The Company officers and military men were allowed to take their arms and ammunition with them, and were escorted by nearly the whole of the rebel army. They reached the Satichaura Ghat by 8 am. At this ghat, Nana Saheb had arranged around 40 boats, belonging to a boatman called Hardev Mallah, for their departure to Allahabad.
However, Nana Saheb's rebels had deliberately placed the boats as high in the mud as possible to delay the boarding, and the Europeans found it difficult to drift the boats away. Wheeler and his party were the first aboard and the first to manage to set their boat adrift. At this point three shots were fired from the direction of Nana Saheb's camp, which was the signal to initiate the attack. The Indian boatmen jumped overboard and started swimming toward the banks. However, according to Mowbray Thompson, one of the few survivors of the massacre, before the boatmen jumped overboard they had "contrived to secrete burning charcoal in the thatch of most of the boats", which set some of the boats ablaze. Though controversy surrounds what exactly happened next at the Satichaura Ghat, the departing Europeans were attacked by the rebel sepoys, and most of were either killed or captured.

Some of the Company officers later claimed that Nana had placed the boats as high in the mud as possible, on purpose to cause delay. They also claimed that Nana had previously arranged for the rebels to fire upon and kill all the Europeans. Although the East India Company later accused Nana of betrayal and murder of innocent people, no definitive evidence has ever been found to prove that Nana had pre-planned or ordered the massacre. Some historians believe that the Satichaura Ghat massacre was the result of confusion, and not of any plan implemented by Nana and his associates. Nevertheless, the fact that sniper fire from cannons pre-positioned along the riverbank was reported on the scene might suggest pre-planning.

Whatever the case, amid the prevailing confusion at the Satichaura Ghat, Nana's general Tatya Tope allegedly ordered the 2nd Bengal Cavalry unit and some artillery units to open fire on the Europeans. The rebel cavalry sowars moved into the water to kill the remaining Company soldiers with swords and pistols. The surviving men were killed, while women and children were captured, as Nana did not approve of their killing. Around 120 women and children were taken prisoner and escorted to Savada House, Nana Saheb's headquarters during the siege.

The rebel soldiers also pursued Wheeler's boat, which was slowly drifting to safer waters. After some firing, the European men on the boat decided to fly the white flag. They were escorted off the boat and taken back to Savada house. The surviving men were seated on the ground, as Nana's soldiers got ready to kill them. The women insisted that they would die with their husbands, but were pulled away. Nana granted the British chaplain Moncrieff's request to read prayers before they were killed. The British were initially wounded with the guns, and then killed with the swords. The women and children were taken to Savada House to be reunited with their remaining colleagues.

Bibighar massacre
The surviving women and children, around 120 in number, were moved from the Savada House to Bibighar ("the House of the Ladies"), a villa-type house in Kanpur. They were later joined by some other women and children, the survivors from Wheeler's boat. Another group of women and children from Fatehgarh, and some other captive women were also confined in Bibighar. In total, there were around 200 women and children there.

Nana Saheb deputed a tawaif (nautch girl) called Hussaini Khanum (also known as Hussaini Begum) to care for these survivors. He decided to use these prisoners in bargaining with the East India Company. The Company forces consisting of around 1,000 British, 150 Sikh soldiers and 30 irregular cavalry had set out from Allahabad, under the command of General Henry Havelock, to retake Cawnpore and Lucknow. Havelock's forces were later joined by the forces under the command of Major Renaud and James Neil. Nana demanded that the East India Company forces under Havelock and Neil retreat to Allahabad. However, the Company forces advanced relentlessly towards Cawnpore. Nana sent an army to check their advance, and the two armies met at Fattehpore on 12 July, where General Havelock's forces emerged victorious and captured the town.

Nana then sent another force under the command of his brother, Bala Rao. On 15 July, the British forces under General Havelock defeated Bala Rao's army in the Battle of Aong. On 16 July, Havelock's forces started advancing to Kanpur. 

Nana Sahib, and his associates, including Tatya Tope and Azimullah Khan, debated about what to do with the captives at Bibighar. Some of Nana Sahib's advisors had already decided to kill the captives at Bibighar, as revenge for the executions of Indians by the advancing British forces. The women of Nana Sahib's household opposed the decision and went on a hunger strike, but their efforts went in vain.

Recapture of Kanpur by the British

The Company forces reached Kanpur on 16 July 1857. General Havelock was informed that Saheb had taken up a position at the Ahirwa village. His forces launched an attack on Nana's forces, and emerged victorious. Nana then blew up the Kanpur magazine, abandoned the place, and retreated to Bithur. When the British soldiers came to know about the Bibighar massacre, they indulged in retaliatory violence, including looting and burning of houses.

 

On 19 July, General Havelock resumed operations at Bithur, though Nana Saheb had already escaped. Major Stevenson led a group of Madras Fusiliers and Sikh soldiers to Bithoor and occupied Nana Sahib's palace without any resistance. The British troops seized guns, elephants and camels, and set Nana Sahib's palace on fire. The British seized guns, elephants and camels, and set fire to Nana's palace. Very few relics of Nana Saheb are known but a silver mounted sword seems to be one of the more interesting. Many British search parties tried to capture Nana Saheb but all failed to prevent his escape. A detachment of the 7th Bengal Infantry came very near to capturing him but he managed to escape just in time. In his hurry he left this sword on the table where he had been dining.  Major Templer (later Major General) of the 7th Bengal Infantry brought home the sword.  In the 1920s the family loaned it to the Exeter Museum, until 1992 when it was sold at auction.  The present whereabouts of this sword are unknown.

Disappearance 
Nana disappeared after the Company's recapture of Kanpur. His general Tatya Tope tried to recapture Kanpur in November 1857, after gathering a large army, mainly consisting of the rebel soldiers from the Gwalior contingent. He managed to take control of all the routes west and north-west of Kanpur, but was later defeated in the Second Battle of Kanpur.

In September 1857, Nana was reported to have fallen to malarious fever; however, this is doubtful. Rani Laxmibai, Tatya Tope and Rao Saheb (Nana Saheb's close confidante) proclaimed Nana Saheb as their Peshwa in June 1858 at Gwalior.

Nepal connection
By 1859, Nana was reported to have fled to Nepal. Perceval Landon recorded that Nana Sahib lived out his days in western Nepal, in Thapa Teli, near Ririthang, under the protection of Sir Jang Bahadur Rana, the Prime Minister of Nepal. His family also received protection, in Dhangara, eastern Nepal, in exchange for precious jewels. In February 1860, the British were informed that Nana's wives had taken refuge in Nepal, where they resided in a house close to Thapathali. Nana himself was reported to be living in the interior of Nepal. Some early government records maintained that he died in Nepal after a tiger attacked him during a hunt on 24 September 1859 but other record differs on the matter. Nana's ultimate fate was never known.

Venkateshwar, a Brahmin interrogated by the British, disclosed that he met Nana Saheb in Nepal in 1861. Up until 1888 there were rumours and reports that he had been captured and a number of individuals turned themselves in to the British claiming to be the aged Nana. As these reports turned out to be untrue further attempts at apprehending him were abandoned. There were also reports of him being spotted in Constantinople (Present days Istanbul).

Sihor connection
Two letters and a diary retrieved in the 1970s accounted that he lived as an ascetic, Yogindra Dayanand Maharaj, in Sihor in coastal Gujarat until his death in 1903. Harshram Mehta, the Sanskrit teacher of Nana Saheb, was addressed in the two letters probably written by him in Old Marathi and in black ink dated 1856 and signed Baloo Nana. The third document is the diary of Kalyanji Mehta, brother of Harshram. In Old Gujarati, the diary records arrival of Nana Saheb to Sihor with his colleagues after failure of rebellion. Kalyanji had raised Shridhar, son of Nana Saheb changing his name to Giridhar, as his own son and got him married in Sihori Brahmin family. His diary also records death of Nana Saheb in 1903 in Dave Sheri, Kalyanji's house in Sihor. The place still displays some articles of him. Keshavlal Mehta, son of Giridhar, recovered these documents in the 1970s and his descendants still live in town.

The authenticity of documents was accepted by G.N. Pant, former director of the National Museum, in 1992 but the official recognition was never given.

Belsare's account
K. V. Belsare's book on the Maharashtrian saint Brahmachaitanya Gondavlekar Maharaj claims that after the lost battle, Nana Saheb went to Naimisharanya, the Naimisha Forest in the vicinity of Sitapur, Uttar Pradesh, where he met Brahmachaitanya maharaj, who assured him safety. He lived there from 1860 until his death in 1906. According to the book, he died between 30 October to 1 November 1906 and Shri Brahmachaitanya maharaj performed his last rites. The authenticity of the claims in the book is not established.

Initially Nanasaheb was very much upset from losing the kingdom in battle with the British. But Shri Gondavalekar Maharaj explained to him the "Wish of God". He said, "It is very sad that Nanasaheb had to lose the battle and the kingdom in such a tragic way, but fighting with the British is totally different than fighting with Mughals. People from the middle class who know the British language will lead the next freedom war against British. Soon they will come into the picture. Your role as King or warrior has finished, and now you need to focus on the 'internal war'." Initially it was very difficult for him to accept this fact, but slowly, Nanasaheb accepted this and made progress on the path to God.

After the independence of India in 1947, Nana was hailed as a freedom fighter, and the Nana Rao Park in Kanpur was constructed in honour of Nana and his brother, Bala Rao.

In popular culture 
Nana Sahib, a drama in verse by Jean Richepin with incidental music by Jules Massenet, opened on 20 December 1883 at the Théâtre de la Porte Saint-Martin in Paris.

Nana Sahib (based on Captain Nemo) is the principal character of the 1975 Soviet film Captain Nemo, his role is played by Vladislav Dvorzhetsky. He is also seen in Age of Empires III: The Asian Dynasties as Nanib Sahir.

Jules Verne's novel The End of Nana Sahib (also published under the name "The Steam House"), taking place in India ten years after the 1857 events, is based on these rumours, and not historically accurate - for example, the novel claims Nana Saheb had been married to Rani Lakshmibai of Jhansi.

In The Devil's Wind, Manohar Malgonkar gives a sympathetic reconstruction of Nana Saheb's life before, during and after the mutiny as told in his own words.

Another novel Recalcitrance published in 2008 the 150th anniversary year of the Indian Rebellion of 1857 and written by Anurag Kumar shows a character similar to Sahib receiving blessings from an Indian sage who also gives him a special boon connected to his life and the rebellion of 1857.

The character of Surat Khan in the 1936 film The Charge of the Light Brigade seems to be loosely based on Nana Saheb.

A novel by Donald Cirulli titled The Devil's Wind was published in 2018 described, among other things, the siege of Wheeler's Entrenchment at Cawnpore and the British attack of Delhi (both in 1857).

The character of Nana Saheb is portrayed by Bhupinder Singh in the DD National TV series 1857 Kranti.

In Bharat Ek Khoj character of Nana Saheb was portrayed Anang Desai.

In Satyajit Ray's Feluda novel Bombaiyer Bombete, a necklace belonging to Nana Saheb from Kathmandu is smuggled into India.

See also
 List of people who disappeared
Ethnic communities in Kanpur
Nana Fadnavis

References

Further reading
 
 

1824 births
1850s missing person cases
1859 deaths
Indian independence activists from Uttar Pradesh
Jules Verne
Missing person cases in India
People from Kanpur
Revolutionaries of the Indian Rebellion of 1857
Warriors of the Maratha Empire
Year of death unknown